Pedzisai Ruhanya is a former News Editor for Zimbabwean independent newspaper Daily News. He is a former president of the Harare Polytechnic Students Representative Council serving with people including Secretary General Lance Guma, Vice President Alec Magama, Information and Publicity Secretary Sibanengi Dube. Ruhanya is the Programmes Manager for the Crisis in Zimbabwe Coalition. In 2008 he was awarded a Humphrey Fellowship by the University of Minnesota.

References

Year of birth missing (living people)
Living people
Zimbabwean journalists
21st-century Zimbabwean writers